4-Chlorophenyl azide is an organic aryl azide compound with the chemical formula C6H4ClN3. The geometry between the nitrogen atoms in the azide functional group is approximately linear while the geometry between the nitrogen and the carbon of the benzene is  trigonal planar.

Preparation 
There are various methods to synthesize aryl azides. One such method would be to set use react aniline with sodium nitrite (NaNO2) and hydrazine hydrate in the presence of acetic acid. This reaction will give moderate to good yield of the desired aryl azide. The best solvent for this reaction is dichloromethane. Dichloromethane is most effective because it is only slightly polar whereas highly polar solvents give significantly lower yields in this reaction. The reactants dissolve in a less polar solvent better and the reaction proceeds more fully towards completion. Two equivalents of sodium nitrite should be used with five equivalents of hydrazine hydrate to get a high yield of aryl azide.  To form 4-chlorophenyl azide specifically, an aniline with a chloride group in the para position is used. The sodium nitrite reacts with aniline to form a diazonium salt that performs nucleophilic substitution with the azide ion formed by another reaction between sodium nitrite and hydrazine hydrate in an acidic medium. Such a reaction takes around 30 minutes to complete and gives around an 80% yield. This is an effective method of synthesis because of the short reaction time, easy work-up and inexpensive reagents. A picture of the preparation reaction is shown below:

Another synthesis method that was researched was the Wong Synthesis which makes use of the reagents NaN3 and Tf2O.  The study of this synthesis method was very detailed because NaN3 is known to be explosive so careful attention to the synthesis procedures must be used.

Reactions 

Azides are used in a variety of useful reactions and syntheses.  In many different reactions they act as an intermediate step to convert a substituent group to an amine.  The reason why using azides is useful in this process is because one of the products of reaction is nitrogen gas (N2).  When a reaction produces gas there is a thermodynamically favorable push towards the products of the reaction.  This relates to 4-chlorophenyl azide because this molecule is an intermediate during the formation of 4-chlorophenyl amine.  In many instances lithium aluminum hydride (LAH) is used to reduce the azide functional group.  An example of this reaction is the following:

Upon further reactions from the above synthesis, 4-chlorophenyl azide can also lead to the useful transformation of the iminium ion.  The iminium ion is important in organic syntheses because it reacts similarly like a carbonyl compound.  A partial positive charge builds up on the carbon that is doubly bound to the nitrogen which provides an excellent site for nucleophilic attack.  A simple way to make the iminium ion is to react an amine with formaldehyde so water leaves the reaction and favors the iminium creation.  An example of this reaction is seen below:

Aryl azides such as 4-chlorophenyl azide are important in click chemistry. 4-chlorophenyl azide is versatile in joining different molecules and is used in some reactions that are very simple and give high yields (characteristics of reactions of click chemistry). One of these reactions is between 4-chlorophenyl azide and alkynes to produce 1,2,3-triazoles. An example of this reaction is shown below:

Applications 
The use of azides is very important in a variety of different applications in organic and biological chemistry.  Azides are used in the research of drug applications, in materials science, and also all throughout biology.  A majority of the research that is conducted on azides pertains to the catalyst that is needed to create the azide itself.  Previously stated, LAH was used for the conversion of the amine to the azide, but this is not always the most environmentally beneficial way of forming the desired product.  Research is conducted in many different biological environments to see if a certain catalyst will be recyclable and/or environmentally friendly.

One specific application of 4-chlorophenyl azide is in Friedel Crafts acylation and alkylation.  The azide on 4-chlorophenyl azide acts as an electron withdrawing group since the azide has a partial positive charge that is withdrawing electrons from the ring.  This means that the azide substituent acts as a meta director in Friedel Crafts acylation and alkylation.  Consequently, the chloride on 4-chlorphenyl azide is a deactivating agent, but it also directs to the ortho/para positions on the aromatic ring.  Due to the substituent effects on 4-chlorophenyl azide, acylation and alkylation would yield a major product that is newly substituted in the 3- and 5-positions on the aromatic ring.  An example of this reaction is given below:

Another application of 4-chlorophenyl azide is through the use of fungicides on plant pathogens.  It is important to control fungal pathogens on plants so that there is a high crop yield during the harvesting season.  A multitude of compounds were tested on plant seeds to test the effectiveness of the fungicide.  4-Chlorophenyl Azide was a substituent bonded to the main molecular compound of which the entire research was conducted.

Structure and Bonding 
4-chlorophenyl azide is an aryl azide. This is a benzene ring with an azide group and a chloride ion connected in the para position. The azide group is characterized by three nitrogen atoms connected together by two double bonds and is isoelectric with CO2. This forms a positive charge on the middle nitrogen and negative charges on the outside nitrogens. When connected in an aromatic ring, the extra charge on the outside is an important aspect of the molecules reactivity. This extra outside charge is able to stabilize the positive charge on the middle nitrogen and allow for the release of nitrogen gas, an important step in reactions that include 4-chlorophenyl azide. The size and structure of this molecule make it an important component in click chemistry.

References 

 Siddiki, A.A., Takale, B.S., & Telvekar, V.N. (2013). One pot synthesis of aromatic azide using sodium nitrite and hydrazine hydrate. Tetrahedron Letters, 54(10), 1294. Retrieved on April 11, 2013.

Organoazides
Chlorobenzenes